Melvin Jules Bukiet is an author and literary critic.  He has written a number of novels, including Sandman's Dust, After, While the Messiah Tarries, Signs and Wonders, Strange Fire, and A Faker's Dozen.  He edited the collections Neurotica: Jewish Writers on Sex, Nothing Makes You Free, and Scribblers on the Roof.  He won the 1992 Edward Lewis Wallant Award.

References

External links
 Sheryl Silver Ochayon: Interview With Melvin Jules Bukiet, Author and Professor, Sarah Lawrence College. On History and Fiction, in Yad Vashem website

20th-century American novelists
21st-century American novelists
American historical novelists
Living people
American male novelists
20th-century American male writers
21st-century American male writers
Year of birth missing (living people)